The Bird and Dinkelspiel Store in Birds Landing, California was built in 1875.  The building was listed on the National Register of Historic Places in 1999.

It is a two-story balloon-framed building at a cross-roads which was the starting point of the town of Birds Landing.

It is a California listed resource.

References

History of Solano County, California
Commercial buildings completed in 1875
Buildings and structures in Solano County, California
Commercial buildings on the National Register of Historic Places in California
National Register of Historic Places in Solano County, California